Pachachaca is a river and valley of the Andes in Peru. Abancay lies on the river and in flows through the Ampay National Sanctuary. It is a notable kayaking location.

References
www.peruwhitewater.com

Rivers of Peru
Rivers of Apurímac Region
Tributaries of the Ucayali River